B.T. Brown Reservoir is a reservoir of  in Coweta County, Georgia, United States. It is located at 621 S Alexander Creek Road Newnan, Georgia 30263.  The reservoir is maintained by the Coweta County Water & Sewerage Authority . The reservoir was built for its ability to be a water treatment facility. The reservoir was rebuilt at a cost of $13 million and completed in 2006.  The production of drinking water began in 2007.  As of 2007, this facility will produce  of water daily with a maximum capacity to produce  daily.

Fishing
B.T. Brown reservoir is accessible to all Coweta County Residents with a few requirements. Obtaining a permit requires going to the Coweta County Water & Sewerage Authority located at 545 Corinth Road, Newnan, Georgia 30263.

Pavilion
The Pavilion has 3 connected shaded areas with picnic tables and restroom accessibility.  The Pavilion area has swings and multiple playground areas for children.  The Pavilion is accessible to all Coweta County Residents with a few requirements.
 Pavilions opens at 8:00am and closes at sunset or posted time.
 You can reserve the Pavilion for a local event by contacting the Coweta County Water & Sewerage Authority which is located at 545 Corinth Road, Newnan, Georgia 30263.

References

External links
 www.cowetawaterauthority.com
 www.vikaza.com Map
 maps.google.com maps

Reservoirs in Georgia (U.S. state)
Protected areas of Coweta County, Georgia
Bodies of water of Coweta County, Georgia